Fred Haines may refer to:
Fred Haines (1936–2008), American screenwriter and film director
Fred S. Haines (1879–1960), Canadian painter
Sir Frederick Haines (1819–1909), British army officer